Eulah Elizabeth Tucker (January 28, 1924 – August 20, 2012) was a pitcher who played from  through  in the All-American Girls Professional Baseball League. Listed at 5' 4", 123 lb., she batted and threw right-handed.

A native of Detroit, Michigan, Tucker received an invitation in 1946 to participate in the AAGPBL spring training held at Pascagoula, Mississippi. After making the league tryout, she was allocated to the Peoria Redwings.  A hard-thrower underhand pitcher, Tucker struggled through the many stages of the league, including shifting from underhand (1946) to sidearm (1947) to overhand (1948) pitching, although she hurled on awful expansion teams that did not give her much run support.

After a year in Peoria, Tucker opened 1947 with the Fort Wayne Daisies and then found herself on the move again, this time to the Rockford Peaches and then the Grand Rapids Chicks. The next year she joined the Chicago Colleens, and returned to the Redwings in 1949, her last AAGPBL season. After that, Tucker pitched in 1950 for the Rockola Chicks of the rival National Girls Baseball League, which was based in Chicago, and remained underhand pitching through 1953. At the time, many AAGPBL players also joined the NGBL because of better salaries and in some cases for not being on the road as much was also important.

The AAGPBL folded in 1954, but there is a permanent display at the Baseball Hall of Fame and Museum at Cooperstown, New York since November 5,  that honors them.

Tucker was a long time resident of Tucson, Arizona, where she died in 2012 at the age of 88.

Sources

1924 births
2012 deaths
All-American Girls Professional Baseball League players
Baseball players from Detroit
Baseball players from Tucson, Arizona
National Girls Baseball League players
21st-century American women
American female baseball players